A punchboard is a game board, primarily consisting of a number of holes, which was used once for lottery games.

History

Origin
Punchboards were originally used in the 18th century for gambling purposes. A local tavern owner would construct a game board out of wood, drill small holes in it, and fill each hole with a small paper ticket or gamepiece. The holes were then typically covered with paper or foil. After a patron bought a chance at the punchboard, he would puncture one of the hole's paper or foil covers with a nail and retrieve the ticket/gamepiece. If the gamepiece contained a winning number, the patron won the prize.

In the nineteenth century, board operators eventually drilled into their own holes (they knew where the big money was because they made the board). The punchboard's use started to decline.

Paper punchboard

In the late 1800s, a new type of punchboard was introduced. This one involved putting paper in both the front and back of the hole (to help prevent operators from cheating). These new punchboards became popular purchases at drugstores, and they were sold with a metal stylus. The punchboard soon became increasingly similar to today's lottery tickets.

Soon, the punchboard became cheap and easy to assemble, and the industry flourished. Noted gambling author John Scarne estimates that 30 million punchboards were sold in the years between 1910 and 1915. He also estimates that 50 million punchboards were sold in 1939 alone, during the peak of their popularity.

After World War II

After World War II, use of the punchboard as a gambling tool began to decline because many people frowned at its gambling-like nature, and the punchboard was outlawed in many states. The use of punchboards for advertisement started to gain popularity. Many companies started hiding goods such as bottles of beer and cigarettes inside punchboards.
Zippo lighters reportedly sold more than 300,000 lighters through punchboard advertising between 1934 and 1940.

Larceny

People have been cheating on punchboards ever since they were first invented. Many operators know where the big prize holes are; they used to create punchboards with very few holes so they could easily track the big money.

Other gamblers could make a dirty deal with the customers: give the customer a "map" of where the big prizes are on the punchboard. This came to prevention by the use of serial numbers: the customer would present the slip to the operator, and if the serial numbers matched, the customer was declared a winner.

Other references in popular culture
Episode The Troubleshooter of the Untouchables involved the illegal mob activities around punchboards.
The feature film The Flim-Flam Man starring George C. Scott involved the use of illegal gambling through punchboards.
On the American television game show The Price Is Right, an over-sized punchboard is used as part of its pricing game "Punch a Bunch". 
The novel Sweet Creek Holler by Ruth White.
A punchboard is featured in the final episode of the TV show of Quantum Leap.
The "Fibber McGee and Molly" radio series frequently refers to the punchboard at Fibber's Elks Lodge.
In the 1940 musical film “Strike Up The Band”, a character suggests punchboards as a way to earn money to get Mickey Rooney’s band and Judy Garland to Chicago for an audition with Paul Whiteman. 
Madame Fortuna, a character in Stephen King's book Joyland, has a punchboard in her cash box.
The 1947 "Pennies for Plunder" storyline from the radio series The Adventures of Superman revolved around a crooked punchboard racket directed at children and a Daily Planet campaign to promote the outlawing of punchboards.
In the novel "Winter In The Blood" by James Welch a character is using a punchboard.
In the novel "The Grifters" by Jim Thompson, Roy Dillon attempts to grift a punchboard in a bar.
In the 1963 TV episode of "The Virginian" titled "The Exiles" The Virginian is searching for a murderer, Ralph Slocum, an alleged punchboard salesman.
In the novel "Tattoo" by Earl Thompson, the main character tries to cheat on a punchboard.

Notes

External links
History of the punchboard
stories, pictures, and history of punchboards

Lotteries